Paul Augustus Bridle (October 1914 – February 1988) was a Canadian diplomat. He was born in Toronto, Ontario, the son of Augustus Bridle, a journalist and novelist. He studied at Parkdale Collegiate Institute and the University of Toronto, receiving his BA in 1937. He then taught briefly at Upper Canada College before joining the Canadian Navy in World War II. In 1942, he married Helen Joan Hilborn and they had a daughter named Liska. After the war he joined the Department of External Affairs. He was appointed Acting High Commissioner to Newfoundland followed by Commissioner to Laos (ICSC) then as Ambassador Extraordinary and Plenipotentiary to Turkey then a second term as Commissioner to Laos (ICSC).

External links 
 Foreign Affairs and International Trade Canada Complete List of Posts
 List of City of Cambridge Archives collections including Hilborn-Bridle fonds

1914 births
1988 deaths
High Commissioners of Canada to the Dominion of Newfoundland
Ambassadors of Canada to Turkey
Ambassadors of Canada to Laos